Orphan Colours is a British band formed by former Ahab members Steve "Seebs" Llewellyn and Dave Burn. They have been dubbed a "supergroup" because they are joined by former Noah and the Whale guitarist Fred Abbot, Danny and the Champions of the World drummer Steve Brookes and prominent member of the London folk revival scene Graham Knight.

The band signed to At The Helm Records in 2017 and released All On Red on 26 January 2018. Their debut album was nominated in the 'Best UK Americana Album' category at the 2019 Americana Music Association U.K. Awards.

Discography
 High Hopes EP (26 February 2016)
 Won't Let You Down (28 January 2016)
 All On Red (26 January 2018)

References

External links
 

English folk musical groups
British folk rock groups
Americana music groups
English alternative country groups
Americana in the United Kingdom